Darreh Shur-e Bala (also Romanized as Darreh Shūr-e Bālā; also known as Darreh Shūr and Darreh Shūr-e ‘Olyā) is a village in Mashayekh Rural District, Doshman Ziari District, Mamasani County, Fars Province, Iran. At the 2006 census, its population was 46, in 15 families.

References 

Populated places in Mamasani County